Massimo Codol (born 27 February 1973) is an Italian former racing cyclist, who currently works as a directeur sportif for UCI Continental team .

Major results
2000
 1st Japan Cup Cycle Road Race
 1st Stage 1 Tour of the Basque Country
 2nd Giro dell'Emilia
 8th Giro di Lombardia
2001
 10th Japan Cup Cycle Road Race
2002
 5th Liège–Bastogne–Liège
 6th Japan Cup Cycle Road Race
 10th Overall Giro del Trentino
2005
 8th Overall Settimana Ciclistica Internazionale Coppi-Bartali
2008
 3rd Overall Clásica Internacional de Alcobendas
 4th Overall Settimana Ciclista Lombarda
 7th Overall GP Internacional Paredes Rota dos Móveis
2010
 10th Overall Tour de Wallonie

References

External links 

1973 births
Living people
Italian male cyclists
Sportspeople from Lecco
Cyclists from the Province of Lecco